This List of leading goalscorers for USM Alger contains football players who have played for USM Alger and is listed according to their number of goals scored. starting from 1995–96 season, Billel Dziri is the best scorer with 74 goals and at the same time he is considered the best scorer in the Ligue 1 with 51 goals and in the continental competition with 16 goals. In the Algerian Cup, Tarek Hadj Adlane is the best scorer with 11 goals; also Moncef Ouichaoui is the first player from USM Alger in the league to win best scorer in the 2002–03 season with 18 goals, and Malian Mamadou Diallo is the first who won the top scorer in the continental competition in 2004 CAF Champions League with 10 goals, 15 years after Oussama Darfalou distinguished himself by claiming the title of top scorer in the Algerian league with 18 goals in 27 games. After this success he moved to professionalism in the Netherlands with Vitesse, of the Eredivisie.

Players
Entries in bold text indicates the player is still playing competitive football in USM Alger

Position key:
GK – Goalkeeper;
DF – Defender;
MF – Midfielder;
FW – Forward

1 Includes the Super Cup and League Cup.
2 Includes the Cup Winners' Cup, CAF Cup, Confederation Cup and Champions League.
3 Includes the Champions League and UAFA Club Cup.

Top league goalscorers by season
Entries in bold text indicate the player won the top division with USM Alger
Entries in italic text indicates that a season is in progress

List of USM Alger players hat-tricks
Position key:
GK – Goalkeeper;
DF – Defender;
MF – Midfielder;
FW – Forward;
4 – Player scored four goals;
5 – Player scored five goals;
6 – Player scored six goals;
* – The home team

Multiple hat-tricks
Bold  - still active with USM Alger

See also
 List of USM Alger players

Notes

References